Felix Holzner (born 4 June 1985 in Belzig, Bezirk Potsdam) is a German former football midfielder who played for FC Carl Zeiss Jena.

References

External links
 

1985 births
Living people
People from Bad Belzig
People from Bezirk Potsdam
German footballers
Footballers from Brandenburg
FC Carl Zeiss Jena players
2. Bundesliga players
3. Liga players
Association football midfielders